The 1975 Gent–Wevelgem was the 37th edition of the Gent–Wevelgem cycle race and was held on 9 April 1975. The race started in Ghent and finished in Wevelgem. The race was won by Freddy Maertens of the Carpenter team.

General classification

References

Gent–Wevelgem
1975 in road cycling
1975 in Belgian sport